Andropolia aedon is a moth in the family Noctuidae first described by Augustus Radcliffe Grote in 1880. It is found in North America from British Columbia and Alberta south to California.

Adults are on wing from July to August.

The larvae feed on Alnus, Acer, Holodiscus discolor and Physocarpus capitatus.

References

External links

Acronictinae
Moths of North America